Periyar is a 1973 Indian Malayalam-language film, directed by P. J. Antony. The film stars Thilakan, Raghavan, P. J. Antony and Sudheer. Its musical score was by K. V. Job and P. K. Sivadas. It was also the debut movie of Thilakan, who later became a major actor of character roles.

Cast
Sudheer
Raghavan
Ushanandini
Thilakan
Kaviyoor Ponnamma
P. J. Antony
Sankaradi
Alleppey Vincent
Khadeeja
Radhamani

Soundtrack
The music was composed by K. V. Job and P. K. Sivadas with lyrics by P. J. Antony.

References

External links
 

1973 films
1970s Malayalam-language films